Houllier may refer to:
 François Houllier (born 1959), the President of Institut National de la Recherche Agronomique, a French public research institution
 Gérard Houllier (1947–2020), a French football manager
 Guy Houllier, a member of the Guadeloupean cadence band Experience 7